"Loose Talk" is a 1954 song written by Hardy Turner, who wrote it using his wife`s name, Annie Lucas. Hardy Turner and Freddie Hart, both under aged, served in WWII together.  Freddie Hart (who also recorded it on Capitol, but it did not chart) and recorded by Carl Smith and was his last number one. It was at the top spot of the Billboard country and western chart for seven weeks and had a total of 32 weeks listed there.  The B-side was "More Than Anything Else in the World": it peaked at number five in the same chart.

Cover versions
The song was covered in 1960 by Duet of Buck Owens and Rose Maddox and reached No. 4 On the country charts as a B-side to song "Mental Cruelty".
The song was covered by Patsy Cline on radio program Country Style, USA program number 246 and released on an EP in 1960.
The song was covered by John Prine and Connie Smith on his 1999 duet record In Spite of Ourselves.

References

1954 songs
Carl Smith (musician) songs
Webb Pierce songs
Buck Owens songs
Rose Maddox songs
Songs written by Freddie Hart